NGC 4598 is a barred lenticular galaxy located in the constellation Virgo. NGC 4598 was discovered by astronomer William Herschel on April 15, 1784. The distance to NGC 4598 has not been accurately determined; measurements vary from 64 to 102 million light-years. NGC 4598 is usually considered to be a member of the Virgo Cluster. However, P. Fouqu´e et al. suggests it may be a background galaxy independent of the main cluster.

See also
 NGC 1533

Notes 
1.This value was determined by using the three other measured values given above.

References

External links

Virgo (constellation)
Barred lenticular galaxies
4598
42427
7829
Astronomical objects discovered in 1784
Discoveries by William Herschel
Virgo Cluster